Harmonium was a Quebec progressive rock band formed in 1972 in Montreal.

History
Lead vocalist and guitarist Serge Fiori met Michel Normandeau (vocals and guitar) in a theatre music meeting in November 1972. Later on, in 1973, they met bassist Louis Valois and formed Harmonium. In November 1973, the group performed their first air play on CHOM-FM. They played 3 tracks: Pour un instant, Un musicien parmi tant d'autres, and Un refrain parmi tant d'autres. The first 2 songs were later recorded professionally to be put on their self-titled debut album. The last song was a sequel to Un musicien parmi tant d'autres, but never made the album cut, staying unreleased. A single was also released at the time with the hit Pour un instant on side A and 100,000 Raisons on side B, the latter only included on the CD version of the album nearly 20 years later. This album was a huge success and a sold out tour was staged all over Quebec and in French Canada.

Their second album Si on avait besoin d'une cinquième saison, better known as Les Cinq saisons, was an immediate success. This concept album included five songs, each one representing a season with the last song being a long instrumental representing a fifth and imaginary season. For this album, the band recruited two new members, Pierre Daigneault, playing the flutes, sax, and clarinets and Serge Locat, handling the piano and synthesizer. The group also invited two guests to play on the sessions: Judi Richards, who handles the vocalizations on the instrumental "Histoires sans paroles" and Marie Bernard performing the theremin-like sounds of the Martenot waves. In 2015, Rolling Stone magazine listed this album at number 36 of the best 50 progressive rock album and declared it the best progressive folk album.

Finally, the double album L'Heptade, was released in 1976 after months of recording in Serge Fiori's own house in St-Césaire, Québec. The songs describe seven stages of consciousness in a person's daily life. The first and the last songs are named "Comme un fou" and "Comme un sage", indicating a progression towards wisdom; from a fool to a sage.

The group was invited to Los Angeles, where the performance of old and new material was filmed by a team from the National Film Board of Canada and released as Harmonium en Californie in October 1979. The new songs were published on the album Deux cents nuits à l'heure, a side-project headed by Serge Fiori and Richard Séguin under the name Fiori-Séguin in mid-1977. Harmonium's last concert is said to have taken place at the Centre de la Nature in Laval, Quebec, in late 1978. Harmonium en tournée, a live version of L'Heptade recorded in Vancouver in 1977, was released in 1980.

In 2007, all three of Harmonium's studio albums were named among the 100 greatest Canadian albums of all time in Bob Mersereau's book The Top 100 Canadian Albums. They were the only francophone albums from Quebec named to the list besides Jean-Pierre Ferland's Jaune.

L'Heptade XL, a remixed version of the album, with a few minutes of new recordings, was released on November 18th 2016 to celebrate its fortieth anniversary. The initial mix of l`Heptade was made as the group was touring in the USA. The remastering reflected more closely the vision of Fiori, into fully open music compared to the original studio mix. It was accompanied by the release of an extra song recorded live in 1977, called C'est dans le noir, available on iTunes. This song was recorded at the National Arts Centre in Ottawa during the tour for the album. Viens voir le paysage, a film of one of these performances, was also released on DVD for the same occasion.

In 2018, the group were awarded honorary Prix Félix at the 40th annual Gala de l'ADISQ. Despite being one of the most influential bands in Quebec music history, the band never won a Félix as they had broken up by the time the awards were launched.

A remix from the original 16-track master tapes of the group's first album, titled Harmonium XLV was released in December 2019 which includes a different take of the hit Pour un instant.  A reissue of Si on avait besoin d'une cinquième saison is also in the works.

In 2020, Simon Leclerc scored a full orchestral version of the totality of Harmonium's music and recorded it with the Montreal Symphony Orchestra. The album came as a surprise for Serge Fiori, who called it a masterpiece and maybe the best versions of his music as he stated in an interview at Radio-Canada, that this represented the ultimate evolution of his music that from day one was most likely meant to be played with such orchestral arrangements. "Histoires sans paroles : Harmonium symphonique" is distributed by mail order or download only.

Discography

Studio albums
 Harmonium (February 1974)
 Harmonium XLV (December 2019)
 Si on avait besoin d'une cinquième saison (April 1975)
 L'Heptade (November 1976)
 L'Heptade XL (November 2016)

Live albums
 Harmonium en tournée (1980)

Singles
 "Pour un instant" / "100 000 Raisons" (1974)
 "Dixie" / "En pleine face" (1975)

Videography
 Harmonium en Californie (October 1979) (NFB)
 Viens voir le paysage (November 2016)

Album line-up chart

Members
 Serge Fiori: vocals, 12 string guitars, keyboards (in later concerts) (November 1972 - 1978)
 Michel Normandeau: guitars, back-up vocals (November 1972- Summer 1976)
 Louis Valois: bass, back-up vocals (1973 - 1979)
 Richard Beaudet: saxophone (1973 - 1974)
 Pierre Daigneault: flute, saxophone (April 1974 – 1975)
 Serge Locat: keyboards, synthesizers, samplers (August 1974 – November 1977)
 Denis Farmer: drums, percussions (1976 - 1979)
 Robert Stanley: guitars (1976 - 1977)
 Monique Fauteux: piano, vocals (1976 - 1979)
 Libert Subirana: flute, saxophone (1976 - 1979)
 Neil Chotem: orchestral composer and arranger (1976 - 1979)
 Jeff Fisher: keyboards, synthesizers (1977)
 Yvan Ouellet: piano, keyboards, synthesizers (1978)

References

External links
 Harmonium on Last.fm
 Harmonium on Québec Info Musique

Musical groups established in 1972
Musical groups disestablished in 1978
Musical groups from Montreal
Canadian progressive rock groups
Symphonic rock groups
Félix Award winners